Mary Katherine Bryan (February 13, 1877 – February 22, 1962) was an American botanist and phytopathologist. Much of her research involved leaf spots and cankers caused by bacteria.

Life and career
Bryan was born in Prince George's County, Maryland, on February 13, 1877. She earned a bachelor's degree from Stanford University in 1908. She worked at the Bureau of Plant Industry in the United States Department of Agriculture as a scientific assistant and assistant pathologist from 1909 to 1918.

She and Nellie A. Brown worked for Erwin Frink Smith.

Bryan died on February 22, 1962, in Napa, California.

References

External links
Mary Katherine Bryan (b. 1877) via Smithsonian Institution

American botanists
1877 births
1962 deaths
United States Department of Agriculture people
Women botanists
20th-century American women scientists